Helsingborgs Rugby Club Gripen, also known as HRC Gripen is a rugby union club in Sweden. Founded in 1968 in the city of Helsingborg.

External links
 Official Site

Swedish rugby union teams